Acollesis is a genus of moths in the family Geometridae.

Species
 Acollesis fraudulenta Warren, 1898
 Acollesis mimetica Prout, 1915
 Acollesis oxychora Prout, 1930
 Acollesis terminata Prout, 1912
 Acollesis umbrata Warren, 1899

References
 Acollesis at Markku Savela's Lepidoptera and some other life forms

Geometrinae
Geometridae genera